Shaken Onlasynuly Niyazbekov (Şäken Оñlаsynūly Niiazbekov; ; 12 November 1938 – 16 August 2014) was a Kazakhstani artist best known for designing the flag of Kazakhstan.

He was born on 12 November 1938 in Jambul (present-day Taraz). Shaken Niyazbekov left Secondary school and entered Leningrad art-industrial college. During studying in this college he participated in restoration works in the Hermitage, Isakiev’s cathedral and Petrodvorets.

Niyazbekov's project of the national flag of the Republic of Kazakhstan was chosen among more than 600 proposals.

Sources

Akim`s administration of Auezov district homepage
The Embassy of the Republic of Kazakhstan in the UK homepage

1938 births
2014 deaths
Kazakhstani artists
Flag designers
People from Taraz